This is a list of cricket grounds in the United States.  The grounds included in this list have held first-class, List-A and Twenty20 matches.  Additionally, one has also hosted Twenty20 Internationals.  Included in the list is St George's Cricket Club Ground, which is notable for holding the first international cricket match.

References

External links
Cricket grounds in the United States at espncricinfo.
Cricket grounds in the United States at CricketArchive.

United States
C